The Nauru national basketball team is the team that represents Nauru in international basketball. It is a member of FIBA Oceania. The national team was inactive in international competitive basketball for several years after participating at the 2001 Oceania Basketball Tournament in Fiji. Nauru initially planned to send a squad to the 2005 South Pacific Mini Games but withdrew due to undisclosed reasons. 
Eventually, it returned for the 2015 Pacific Games.

Nauru had its best performance at the 1969 Pacific Games when it beat the Solomon Islands, which have almost 60 times Nauru's population, and Fiji, which has almost 100 times Nauru's population.

Current roster

At the 2015 Pacific Games: (last publicized squad)

 

 

 

 
 
 

 
 
 
  

|}

| valign="top" |

Head coach
 Detswamo Cherno
Assistant coaches
 Hubert Maika

Legend

Club – describes lastclub before the tournament
Age – describes ageon 3 July 2015

|}
At Nauru's last game at the 2015 Pacific Games against the Solomon Islands, Heine Kanimea was his team's top scorer as he contributed 21 of Nauru's 71 total points.

Competitions

FIBA Oceania Championship

Pacific Games

Pacific Mini Games

Oceania Basketball Tournament

See also
Nauru women's national basketball team

References

Videos
Pacific Games 2015 D5 BASKETBALL MEN KIRBATI vs NAURU Youtube.com video

1975 establishments in Nauru
Men's national basketball teams
Basketball
Basketball teams established in 1975